La Conquête (meaning The Conquest in French) may refer to:
The Conquest (2011), a French film
Conquest of New France (1758–1760), a British military campaign